William Alexander Higgins (born 1870) was an English footballer who played as a full-back. Born in Smethwick, Staffordshire, he played for Manchester United, Albion Swifts, Birmingham St George's, Grimsby Town, Bristol City, Newcastle United and Middlesbrough.

External links
Profile at MUFCInfo.com

1869 births
English footballers
Manchester United F.C. players
Grimsby Town F.C. players
Newcastle United F.C. players
Bristol City F.C. players
Middlesbrough F.C. players
Year of death missing
Association football fullbacks